General elections were held in San Marino on 29 May 1988. The Sammarinese Christian Democratic Party remained the largest party, winning 27 of the 60 seats in the Grand and General Council.

Electoral system
Voters had to be citizens of San Marino and at least 18 years old.

Results

References

San Marino
General elections in San Marino
General
San Marino